The Chesley Award for Best Cover Illustration - Paperback is given by the Association of Science Fiction and Fantasy Artists (ASFA) to recognize achievements in the illustration of science fiction & fantasy paperback books eligible in the year previous to the award.

Winners and nominees

References

External links
 The Chesley Award section of the ASFA website

Cover Illustration Paperback
Science fiction awards